Lee Jae-oh (RR: Yi Jae-o, Hanja: 李在五; born 11 January 1945) is a conservative South Korean politician of the New Party 2018. He was member of the National Assembly for Eunpyeong-gu in Seoul, and served as Minister for Government Legislation and Special Affairs in Lee Myung-bak's administration. He is regarded as a close associate of Lee Myung-bak, and ran unsuccessfully as a candidate for the Saenuri nomination in the 2012 presidential election.

References

1945 births
Living people
Members of the National Assembly (South Korea)
Liberty Korea Party politicians
South Korean presidential candidates, 2012